Butyrolactol A is an organic chemical compound of interest for its potential use as an antifungal antibiotic.

One of a number of potentially useful substances derived from the bacteria Streptomyces rochei, it demonstrates broad antimicrobial activity against fungi, including Candida albicans. Butyrolactol A is a polyketide featuring a tert-butyl group linked to a long hydrophobic carbon chain followed by 8 polyol groups. Research has shown that, using isotopic labeling of media and spectroscopic techniques to identify precursor products which are eventually incorporated into the final product, it can be created via a biosynthetic pathway. Further analysis of gene clusters encoding for biosynthetic enzymes confirmed the presence of polyketide synthesizing genes that are involved with the aforementioned pathways for this molecule.

Biosynthesis

Acetate pathway 
The long carbon chain contained in Butyrolactol A was determined to originate from the acetate pathway by carbon-14 labeling acetate, the two carbon precursor for polyketide synthase. The presence of PKS genes from the Streptomyces family further confirmed the mechanism of acetyl-group based chain elongation. Carbons 1-8 were confirmed to originate from glycolytic pathway intermediate hydroxymalonyl-ACP (Figure). This is supported by 13C labeling, where 13C-13C couplets were present for the aforementioned carbons, as well as gene sequencing, which found genes coding for enzymes involved in hydroxymalonyl-ACP formation in zwittermicin biosynthesis.

tert-Butyl group 
The tert-butyl functional group is a unique moiety in this compound: two of the three carbons were found to originate from the amino acid valine, which contains an isopropyl alkyl side chain. This was determined by deuteration of valine supplied in the media, where mass spectroscopy identified mass/charge ratio reflecting the replacement of 8 hydrogens with deuterium in valine. The final alkyl group in the tert-butyl group was found to be from methionine, likely from S-adenylation. The order in which these precursor units are synthesized has not been confirmed.

References 

Polyketides